The Mehola Junction bombing (also known as the Beit El bombing, literally, the House of God bombing) was the first suicide car bomb attack carried out by Palestinian militants and took place on 16 April 1993.

Hamas bombmaker Yahya Ayyash rigged a Volkswagen Transporter using three large propane tanks and explosives collected from grenades and other ordnance. The bomb was connected to a detonator switch in the driver's controls.

Hamas operative Saher Tamam al-Nabulsi  drove the car to Mehola Junction, a rest area on the Jordan Valley Highway in the West Bank. Just after 1:00 AM, the car exploded between two buses, one civilian and one military. The blast killed al-Nabulsi and Marwan Ghani, a Palestinian from the nearby village of Bardala who worked in a snack bar in Mehola. Ghani's brother and eight Israeli soldiers were slightly injured.

References

Arab–Israeli conflict
1993 in the Palestinian territories
First Intifada
Hamas suicide bombings
Attacks on buses by Palestinian militant groups
Terrorist attacks attributed to Palestinian militant groups
Terrorist incidents in Asia in 1993
1993 crimes in the Israeli Civil Administration area
Islamic terrorism in Israel
1993 murders in Asia